Yu Lele (born 22 March 1989) is a Chinese competitor in synchronized swimming. 

She has won a silver medal at the 2011 World Aquatics Championships. She also won 1 gold medal at the 2010 Asian Games and 2 golds at the 2014 Asian Games.

References
Asian Games Profile

Living people
Chinese synchronized swimmers
1989 births
World Aquatics Championships medalists in synchronised swimming
Synchronized swimmers from Beijing
Artistic swimmers at the 2014 Asian Games
Artistic swimmers at the 2010 Asian Games
Asian Games medalists in artistic swimming
Synchronized swimmers at the 2011 World Aquatics Championships
Synchronized swimmers at the 2017 World Aquatics Championships
Asian Games gold medalists for China
Medalists at the 2010 Asian Games
Medalists at the 2014 Asian Games